is a semiconductor manufacturer headquartered in Chiyoda, Tokyo, Japan. Rapidus was established in August 2022 with the support of eight major Japanese companies:  Denso, Kioxia, MUFG Bank, NEC, NTT, SoftBank, Sony, and Toyota. The goal of Rapidus is to increase advanced semiconductor manufacturing capacity with a 2 nm process by 2027.

Background history
The semiconductor industry in Japan was highly competitive in the 1980s, with a global share reaching 50%. However, the 1986  concluded to resolve trade friction and the rise of South Korea and Taiwan gradually reduced competitiveness. In 1999, Elpida Memory was established by integrating the businesses of Hitachi and NEC for DRAM, one of the semiconductors for memory, and later took over the business of Mitsubishi Electric, and at one point acquired the world's third largest market share in this field. However, management deteriorated due to the Lehman shock in 2009 and the subsequent yen appreciation recession, and although support was provided with government funds, it went bankrupt in 2012. Elpida was acquired by Micron Technology in 2013, and changed its name to Micron Memory Japan in 2014. Due to international competition from companies including TSMC, Samsung Electronics, and Intel, the share of Japanese companies in the semiconductor industry as a whole has fallen to 10% as of 2019.

In May 2022, United States President Joe Biden and Japanese Prime Minister Fumio Kishida met in Tokyo and discussed increased collaboration on important technologies, including semiconductors, nuclear power, space exploration, electric batteries, critical minerals, and supply chains. The Second Kishida Cabinet's basic policy (Honebuto no hōshin) announced on 7 June 2022 included consideration of support for private companies developing next-generation advanced technologies and the establishment of a design and manufacturing infrastructure for next-generation semiconductors in the latter half of the 2020s. On 29 July 2022, high-level talks were held between the United States and Japan by U.S. Secretary of State Antony Blinken, U.S. Commerce Secretary Gina Raimondo, Japanese Foreign Minister Yoshimasa Hayashi and Japanese Trade Minister Koichi Hagiuda to discuss collaboration for semiconductors development. The Ministry of Economy, Trade and Industry (METI) has decided to establish the Leading-edge Semiconductor Technology Center (LSTC) as an organization to conduct next-generation semiconductor research in anticipation of joint research between the two countries based on the basic principles of semiconductor cooperation between Japan and the United States agreed on in May. LSTC and Rapidus collaborate to establish a design and manufacturing platform for next-generation semiconductors in Japan.

Company history 
On 10 August 2022, Rapidus was established by eight Japanese companies with total investment of 7.3 billion yen for domestic production of advanced semiconductors; with further investments totaling $36 billion expected over a decade. Rapidus is led by Tetsuro Higashi (who formerly led Tokyo Electron) and Atsuyoshi Koike (who formerly led Western Digital's Japanese subsidiary). In the same year, METI and the New Energy and Industrial Technology Development Organization (NEDO) publicly solicited applications for advanced semiconductor development consignment projects related to strengthening the foundation of post-5G communication systems, which resulted in 70 billion yen of government subsidies for Rapidus.

On 6 December 2022, IMEC announced it had signed a Memorandum of Cooperation with Rapidus, where both companies will set up a long-term and sustainable collaboration on advanced semiconductor technologies, while Rapidus would plan to mass-produce chips in 2-nanometer technology in Japan in the latter half of 2020s.

On 13 December 2022, IBM and Rapidus announced the development of 2 nanometer node technology, with production of the nanosheet gate-all-around FET (GAA FET) devices previously announced by IBM in 2021 to be done by Rapidus at its fab in Japan. The 2 nm semiconductor chips which Rapidus is aiming to produce are expected to have up to 45% better performance and use 75% less energy compared to 7 nm chips on the market in 2022. In January 2023, representatives of Rapidus and IBM participated in a meeting between Japanese Trade Minister Hagiuda's successor, Yasutoshi Nishimura, and Secretary Raimondo.

See also 

 Micron Memory Japan

References

Foundry semiconductor companies
Semiconductor companies of Japan
SoftBank Group
Toyota
Sony
NEC Corporation
Japanese companies established in 2022